The Afghan Sports Federation (ASP) is a non-profit organization based in Fairfax, Virginia to help Afghan-Americans compete in various sports.

References

External links
Official website

Sports organizations of the United States
Diaspora organizations in the United States